was one of the most famous sociologists in Japan. Mita has studied about modern society at University of Tokyo and influenced many young sociologists such as Masachi Ohsawa, Shunya Yoshimi, Atsushi Miura and Shinji Miyadai.

Biography
Famous Japanese sociologist about modern society. After graduating from the University of Tokyo in 1960, Mita entered that university's graduate school where he completed the coursework for a doctorate.

Under his own name and with the pseudonym Yūsuke Maki (Maki Yūsuke), Mita has published a large amount of material. His numerous books are mostly sociological but include one on Kenji Miyazawa. An English translation of one of his books together with excerpts from several others is published as Social Psychology of Modern Japan.

Mita made a keynote report A Framework for the Sociology of Future: Logistics Curve and the Axial Ages at National Session of World Congress of Sociology in 2014.

Mita received Orders of the Sacred Treasure by the Emperor of Japan in 2017.

One of his sons is Ryūsuke Mita, creator of Dragon Half.

Munesuke Mita has a good relationship with Hiroshi Sugimoto, Michiko Ishimure, Kiyokazu Washida, Shunsuke Tsurumi, Kazuko Tsurumi and Maki Fumihiko.

Books by Mita

Social Psychology of Modern Japan. Trans. Stephen Suloway. London: Kegan Paul International, 1992. 
Psicologia Social del Japon Moderno (Estudios de Asia y Africa).. Spain: El Colegio de Mexico, 1996.

Single-author (Japanese) 

 『現代日本の精神構造』 弘文堂、1965年 NCID BN01205423 のち2004年 朝日出版社、2014年
 『価値意識の理論 - 欲望と道徳の社会学』 弘文堂、1966年8月 のち1987年 
 『近代日本の心情の歴史 - 流行歌の社会心理史』 講談社、1967年11月 全国書誌番号:67002806、NCID BN12908607。
 『現代の青年像』 講談社〈講談社現代新書〉、1968年3月 全国書誌番号:68001618、NCID BN00875384。
 『現代の生きがい - 変わる日本人の人生観』 日本経済新聞社、1970年9月 全国書誌番号:71001107、NCID BN02427191。
 『現代日本の心情と論理』 筑摩書房、1971年5月 全国書誌番号:71001462、NCID BN01330593。
 『人間解放の理論のために』 筑摩書房、1971年10月 全国書誌番号:71009382、NCID BN00592506。 *Yusuke Maki
 『現代社会の存立構造』 筑摩書房、1977年3月 全国書誌番号:77016235、NCID BN0005642X。  *Yusuke Maki
 『気流の鳴る音 - 交響するコミューン』 筑摩書房、1977年5月 全国書誌番号:77013851、NCID BN01202491。 ちくま学芸文庫、2003年  *Yusuke Maki
 『現代社会の社会意識』 弘文堂、1979年4月 全国書誌番号:79017160、NCID BN00645679。
 『青春朱夏白秋玄冬 - 時の彩り・88章』 人文書院、1979年9月 全国書誌番号:80018376、NCID BN02873561。
 『時間の比較社会学』 岩波書店、1981年11月 全国書誌番号:82009797、NCID BN00032283。
 『宮沢賢治 - 存在の祭りの中へ』 岩波書店、1984年2月 全国書誌番号:84031418、NCID BN0027395X。 岩波現代文庫、2001年
 『白いお城と花咲く野原 - 現代日本の思想の全景』 朝日新聞社、1987年4月 
 『自我の起原 - 愛とエゴイズムの動物社会学』 岩波書店、1993年9月  岩波現代文庫、2008年  *Yusuke Maki
 『旅のノートから』 岩波書店、1994年6月   *Yusuke Maki
 『現代日本の感覚と思想』 講談社学術文庫、1995年4月 
 『現代社会の理論 - ―情報化・消費化社会の現在と未来―』 岩波書店〈岩波新書〉、1996年10月 
 『社会学入門 - 人間と社会の未来』 岩波書店〈岩波新書〉、2006年 
 『まなざしの地獄 - 尽きなく生きることの社会学』 河出書房新社、2008年 
 『現代社会はどこに向かうか《生きるリアリティの崩壊と再生》』 弦書房、2012年7月 
 『現代社会はどこに向かうか――高原の見晴らしを切り開くこと』 岩波新書、2018年6月21日

Complete works (Japanese) 

 『定本 見田宗介著作集（全10巻）』 岩波書店、2011年-2012年 NCID BB0731070X
 「現代社会の理論」「現代社会の比較社会学」「近代化日本の精神構造」「近代日本の心情の歴史」「現代化日本の精神構造」「生と死と愛と孤独の社会学」「未来展望の社会学」「社会学の主題と方法」「宮沢賢治――存在の祭りの中へ」「晴風万里――短篇集」
 『定本 真木悠介著作集（全4巻）』 岩波書店、2012年-2013年 NCID BB10395926
 「気流の鳴る音」「時間の比較社会学」「自我の起原」「南端まで――旅のノートから」 *Yusuke Maki

References

External links
 one of his funs’ cafe URL named from Mita’s book

Further reading
Detailed bibliography of Munesuke Mita(Yusuke Maki) by Wikipedia in Japanese

1937 births
2022 deaths 
Deaths from sepsis 
Infectious disease deaths in Japan
Japanese sociologists
Japanese Japanologists
People from Tokyo
University of Tokyo alumni
Academic staff of the University of Tokyo